Pamidimukkala (also known as Veerankilaku) is a village in Krishna district of the Indian state of Andhra Pradesh. It is located in Pamidimukkala mandal of vuyyuru revenue division.

Education 
The primary and secondary school education is imparted by government and private schools, under the School Education Department of the state. The medium of instruction followed by different schools are English, Telugu.

Schools 

Zilla Parishad High School 

Jesus High School.

Mandal Parishad Primary School

Sai Sri Upper Primary School

Nearby Mandals 
Vuyyuru Mandal

Pamarru Mandal

Thotlavalluru Mandal

Movva Mandal

See also 
List of villages in Krishna district

References 

Villages in Krishna district
Mandal headquarters in Krishna district
Villages in Andhra Pradesh Capital Region